Bereznianka is a popular folk dance from southwestern Ukraine (Transcarpathia). It is performed by amateurs, professional Ukrainian dance ensembles as well as other performers of folk dances, and was popularized by choreographers such as Clara Baloh.

References
Rees, "Bereznianka: Becoming Symbolic" (University of Alberta, 2008)
Nahachewsky, Ukrainian Dance (McFarland) p 209

Ukrainian dances
Ukrainian-Canadian culture